Maggy (original "Magali"), is a character of the popular Brazilian comic book series Monica and Friends. She was created by Mauricio de Sousa, who based the character on one of his daughters, Magali Spada e Souza. Monica, Mary Angela (Jimmy's sister) and Marina were also based on Mauricio's daughters. Maggy has her own comic book, in which there are also stories of her cat, Vanilla.

She received her own comic book in 1989 and is being published uninterruptedly since then.

Characteristics 

Maggy is seven years old, although in rare occasions she is described as a six-year-old. Her most notable feature is her voracious appetite. She eats almost everything, usually at high speed, and states to be hungry at all times. Her stories are always centered on food, or at least have her appetite as a recurring gag. Despite this, she never gets fat (a fact which Monica often complains about). Her favorite food is watermelon - just like the real-life Magali.

Maggy is Monica's best friend, and one of the few characters that Monica never beats, except sometimes when Maggy accidentally is punished, as when Monica throws her rabbit toy, Samson, but misses the target and hits Maggy. She wears only a yellow dress and, like Monica and Smudge, she walks barefoot, exposing her feet, which have no toes. In the 399th edition, it is shown that Maggy is left-handed.

Related characters 
 Mrs. Lili – Maggy's mother. She reproves Maggy's superhuman appetite and often complains about the amount of food she has to prepare to satisfy her daughter. Her mother is called 'Gertrudes'.
 Mr. Paulinho – Mr. Paulinho, sometimes known as Carlito, is Maggy's father. He is regularly seen attempting to get rid of Vanilla, whom he dislikes due to his allergy to cats. His mother is called 'Cota'. He is the brother of Cecília, Junior's mother.
 Junior (Dudu) – Junior is Maggy's five-year-old cousin. The opposite of Maggy, he hates eating, even though his mother supplicates for him to eat. For his luck (or for Maggy's), she's often around to help him to eat the food that his mother makes. Beyond that, Junior is always willing to play with the older kids, but as he's too young, they usually avoid playing with him, which makes him angry. Junior is afraid of cats, especially Vanilla, though in later stories he seems to be adapting to the cat (such as the time he pet-sitted for Maggy while she went to the beach). In his solo stories he is often pictured having imaginary adventures (often dealing with animated food).
 Cecília & Durval – Juniors parents. They are always trying to make their son eat, by the most different means. They have yet to be successful.
 Aunt Nina (Tia Nena) – She is Maggy's aunt. Nina owns a candy shop, but in some stories, she owns a restaurant. Nina cooks a lot for Maggy, and also enjoys spending time with magic and wizard-related experiences.
 Vanilla (Mingau) – Maggy's pet cat. Everyone likes it, except for Maggy's boyfriend , because it is allergic to cat hair. In its first story, it says it used to be a street cat, but was adopted by Maggy. It is curious, active and enjoys sleeping, eating, exploring and hunting small prey that appear in its house (mainly mice, cockroaches, flies, and the occasional gecko. Vanilla speaks mainly through thought bubbles, its stories being sometimes monologues. It is usually seen speaking through speech bubble when interacting with another animal, where it is assumed they are speaking in a language humans can't understand. He usually doesn't get along with the canine members of the neighborhood, though sometimes they mutually agree to tolerate each other. Initially, it didn't have a name. However, through a national survey announced on a comic strip, Maggy asked her readers to suggest names for her cat. The winner would be given a real Persian cat (which is stated to be Vanilla's breed. Mingau, which means "porridge" in Portuguese, was chosen by various readers. In the story in which the name was announced, Captain Fray appears and kidnaps Vanilla, stating that he is furious because his name ("Cafifonho" – a nonsense name in Portuguese alluding to the word "fofo" for fluffy/cuddly) wasn't chosen, only to learn he's also allergic to cats. He has recently gained his own comic book series (Mingau e Bidu, "Vanilla and Blu"), which he shares with Blu.
 The Six Cats – Vanilla's siblings that appear very rarely. The first story of 1994 tells the fate of each kitten, all born in the same litter: Matthew, the adventurer, has become the cat of a fishing boat; Nestor, the bohemian, has become a feral cat; Rita, the worker, has become a farm hunter cat; Lily, the spoiled one, has become a madam's cat; Percival, the weird one, has become a witch's cat; Makoto the smart, has become fishmonger's cat; and Vanilla has gone to Maggy's house.
 Toddy (Quinzinho) – He's from Portuguese descent, son of the owner of a local bakery. He's in love with Maggy, and makes everything for her: bread, cake, and other food, even though she eats everything without paying. Sometimes, Quinzinho questions whether Maggy likes him or his food. Quinzinho's real name is 'Joaquim'. Quinzinho is his nickname because it's a diminutive form of Joaquim. Although he was created to be Maggy's boyfriend, she sometimes is seen dating other boys.

References 

 Maggy at Monica's Gang official site
 Vanilla at Monica's Gang official site
 Junior at Monica's Gang official site

External links 
Official site:
English version
Portuguese version

Monica's Gang
Fictional characters based on real people
Fictional Brazilian people
Child characters in comics
Child characters in television
Comics characters introduced in 1964
Animated human characters
Fictional chefs
Female characters in comics
Female characters in animation
Comic book sidekicks
1989 comics debuts
2007 comics debuts